David Idwal Davies (10 November 1915 – 7 July 1990) was a Welsh dual-code international rugby union, and professional rugby league footballer who played in the 1930s and 1940s.

Background
Davies was born in Llanelli district, Wales, he was a Sergeant in the Royal Air Force during World War II, and he died aged 74 in Llanelli, Wales.

Playing career

International honours
Idwal Davies won a cap for Wales (RU) while at Swansea RFC in the 0–3 defeat by England at Twickenham Stadium, London on Saturday 21 January 1939, and won a cap for Wales (RL) while at Leeds in the 8–18 defeat by England at Central Park, Wigan on Saturday 10 March 1945.

References

External links
Team – Past Players – D at swansearfc.co.uk
Profile at swansearfc.co.uk

1915 births
1990 deaths
Dual-code rugby internationals
Leeds Rhinos players
Royal Air Force personnel of World War II
Rugby league centres
Rugby league players from Llanelli
Rugby union centres
Rugby union players from Llanelli
Swansea RFC players
Wales international rugby union players
Wales national rugby league team players
Welsh rugby league players
Welsh rugby union players